Sebastian Pop (born 24 May 2002) is a Norwegian footballer currently playing as a midfielder for Fram Larvik on loan from Strømsgodset.

Career statistics

Club

Notes

References

2002 births
Living people
Norwegian footballers
Norwegian people of Romanian descent
Association football midfielders
Eliteserien players
Strømsgodset Toppfotball players
IF Fram Larvik players